Posen may refer to:

Places

Europe
 Poznań (German: Posen), city in Poland
 Grand Duchy of Posen, autonomous province of Prussia, 1815–1848
 Province of Posen, Prussian province, 1848–1918
 Posen (region), the south-western part of the Province of Posen
 Posen-West Prussia, German province, 1922–1938
 Reichsgau Posen, occupied in 1939, annexed and directly incorporated into the German Reich

United States
 Posen, Illinois, a village
 Posen, Washington County, Illinois, an unincorporated community
 Posen, Michigan
 Posen Township, Michigan
 Posen Township, Minnesota

Other uses
Posen (surname)
 SMS Posen, a German dreadnaught, 1908–1922

See also 
 Posner (disambiguation)
 Pozen (disambiguation)
 Poznań (disambiguation)